Keith Anthony McPherson (born 11 September 1963) is an English former footballer who played in the Football League as a central defender for West Ham United, Cambridge United, Northampton Town, Reading and Brighton & Hove Albion.

Career
Born in Greenwich to Jamaican parents, McPherson was a product of the West Ham United youth team which he joined in 1980 as an apprentice. He was a member of the  1981 Youth Cup winning team which defeated Tottenham Hotspur in the final.
He made just one appearance for West Ham, on 20 May 1985, the last game of the 1984-85 season, in a 3-0 home defeat by Liverpool.
He was signed for Northampton Town from West Ham for £10,000 in January 1986. He made 216 appearances for the Cobblers before leaving in August 1990, to join First Division side Reading where he played for nine years. He ended his career at Brighton & Hove Albion and was player with Slough Town before returning to Reading as a coach.

References

External links

1963 births
Living people
Footballers from Greenwich
English footballers
Association football defenders
West Ham United F.C. players
Cambridge United F.C. players
Northampton Town F.C. players
Reading F.C. players
Brighton & Hove Albion F.C. players
Slough Town F.C. players
English Football League players
Black British sportspeople
English people of Jamaican descent
Association football coaches
English football managers